Blas is mainly a Spanish given name and surname, related to Blaise. It may refer to

Places
Piz Blas, mountain in Switzerland
San Blas (disambiguation)

People
Ricardo Blas Jr. (born 1986) Judo athlete from Guam
Blas Antonio Sáenz (fl. 1845), Nicaraguan politician
Blas Avena, American martial artist
Blas Cabrera Navarro, American physicist
Blas Cabrera (1878–1945), Spanish physicist
Blas Cantó (born 1991), Spanish singer
Blas Chumacero (1905–1997), Mexican trade union leader
Blas Cristaldo (born 1964), Paraguayan football (soccer) defender
Blas de Lezo (1689–1741), Spanish admiral
Blas de Ledesma (1556—1598), Spanish painter
Blas Elias (born 1967), American drummer
Blas Galindo (1910–1993), Mexican composer
Blas Gallego (born 1941), Spanish artist
Blas García Ravelo (17th century), Spanish sculptor
Blas Giunta (born 1963), Argentine football player
Blas Giraldo Reyes Rodríguez (born 1955), Cuban librarian
Blas Hernández (1879–1933), Cuban soldier
Blas Infante (1885–1936), Andalusian politician and writer
Blas María de la Garza Falcón (1712–1767), Spanish settler of Tamaulipas and South Texas
Blas Matamoro (born 1942), Argentine writer
Blas Minor (born 1966), American baseball player
Blas Monaco (1915–2000), American baseball player
Blas Ople (1927–2003), Filipino journalist and politician
Blas Parera (1777–1840), Spanish composer
Blas Pérez (born 1981), Panamanian footballer
Blas Piñar (1918–2014), Spanish politician
Blas Roca Calderio (1908-1987), Cuban revolutionary and politician
Blas Ruiz (16th century), Spanish explorer
Blas Valera (1545–1597), Peruvian historian
Blas Villate (1824–1882), Spanish general
Ismael Blas Rolón Silvero (1914–2010), Paraguayan bishop
Juan Blas de Castro (1561–1631), Spanish singer, musician, and composer

Other uses
Blas de Lezo-class cruiser, Spanish ships
Basic Linear Algebra Subprograms (BLAS), a mathematical software library
List of storms named Blas, used for eight tropical cyclones in the Eastern Pacific Ocean and for one Medicane in the Mediterranean sea.
A word invented by Jan Baptist van Helmont to describe astral radiation

See also
 
 "Bás, Fás, Blás", a poem written by Dominic Behan

Spanish-language surnames